Ludovic Mirande (born 6 January 1977), is a Martiniquais former footballer.

Career statistics

Club

Notes

International

References

1977 births
Living people
Association football defenders
Martiniquais footballers
Martinique international footballers
2002 CONCACAF Gold Cup players
2003 CONCACAF Gold Cup players]
AS Muret players